The 2017 Hall of Fame Tennis Championships (also known as the Dell Technologies Hall of Fame Open for sponsorship reasons) was a men's tennis tournament played on outdoor grass courts. It was the 42nd edition of the Hall of Fame Tennis Championships, and part of the ATP World Tour 250 series of the 2017 ATP World Tour. It took place at the International Tennis Hall of Fame in Newport, Rhode Island, United States, from July 17 through July 23, 2017.

Singles main draw entrants

Seeds 

 1 Rankings are as of July 3, 2017

Other entrants 
The following players received wildcards into the singles main draw:
  Thai-Son Kwiatkowski
  Michael Mmoh
  Rajeev Ram

The following players received entry from the qualifying draw:
  Frank Dancevic
  Matthew Ebden
  Sam Groth
  Austin Krajicek

Withdrawals 
Before the tournament
  Marcos Baghdatis →replaced by  Marco Chiudinelli
  James Duckworth →replaced by  Stefan Kozlov
  Ernesto Escobedo →replaced by  Peter Gojowczyk
  Jürgen Melzer →replaced by  Bjorn Fratangelo
  Gilles Müller →replaced by  Akira Santillan
  Sam Querrey →replaced by  Mitchell Krueger
  Jordan Thompson →replaced by  Tobias Kamke
  Dudi Sela →replaced by  Dennis Novikov
  Mischa Zverev →replaced by  Denis Kudla

Doubles main draw entrants

Seeds 

 Rankings are as of July 3, 2017

Other entrants 
The following pairs received wildcards into the doubles main draw:
  Taylor Fritz /  Mitchell Krueger
  Austin Krajicek /  Gerardo López Villaseñor

Champions

Singles 

  John Isner def.  Matthew Ebden, 6–3, 7–6(7–4)

Doubles 

  Aisam-ul-Haq Qureshi /  Rajeev Ram def.  Matt Reid /  John-Patrick Smith, 6–4, 4–6, [10–7]

References

External links